The Roman Catholic Archdiocese of Nyeri is the Metropolitan See for the Ecclesiastical province of Nyeri, one of four in Kenya, Eastern Africa, yet depends on the missionary Roman Congregation for the Evangelization of Peoples.

The cathedral episcopal see of the archbishop is Our Lady of Consolata Cathedral, in Nyeri.

History 
 September 14, 1905: Established as Mission “sui iuris” of Kenya, on colonial territory split off from the then Apostolic Vicariate of Northern Zanguebar (now Archdiocese of Nairobi)
 July 12, 1909: Promoted as Apostolic Vicariate of Kenya, hence entitled to a titular bishop  by papal brief Supremi Apostolatus by Pius IX
 March 10, 1926: Renamed after its see as Apostolic Vicariate of Nyeri, having lost territory to establish the then Apostolic Prefecture of Meru (now a suffragan diocese)
 March 23, 1953: Promoted as Diocese of Nyeri by papal bulla Quemadmodum ad Nos by Pius XII
 Lost territory on 25 November 1964 to establish the Diocese of Marsabit, now a suffragan
 Lost territory again on 17 March 1983 to establish the Diocese of Murang’a, again a suffragan
 May 21, 1990: Promoted as Metropolitan Archdiocese of Nyeri by papal bulla Cum in Keniana di papa by John Paul II
 Lost territory on 5 December 2002 to establish the Diocese of Nyahururu, as a suffragan.

Ecclesiastical Province 
Its ecclesiastical province comprises the Metropolitan's own Archdiocese and the following Suffragan sees :
 Roman Catholic Diocese of Embu
 Roman Catholic Diocese of Maralal
 Roman Catholic Diocese of Marsabit, daughter
 Roman Catholic Diocese of Meru, daughter
 Roman Catholic Diocese of Muranga, daughter
 Roman Catholic Diocese of Nyahururu, daughter

Statistics 
As per 2014, it pastorally served 490,000 Catholics (34.2% of 1,434,000 total) on 8,450 km² in 48 parishes and 39 missions with 133 priests (121 diocesan, 12 religious), 222 lay religious (72 brothers, 150 sisters) and 73 seminarians.

Bishops
(all Roman rite)

Ordinaries
Ecclesiastical superiors of Missio sui iuris of Kenya : not availableApostolic Vicars of Kenya  
 Filippo Perlo, Consolata Missionaries (I.M.C.) (born Italy) (15 Jul 1909  – 18 Nov 1925), Titular Bishop of Maronea (15 Jul 1909  – 4 Nov 1948), later Superior General of Consolata Missionaries (16 Feb 1926 – retired 11 Jan 1929), died 1948
 Giuseppe Perrachon, I.M.C. (born Italy) (18 Dec 1925  – 4 Jan 1926 see below), Titular Bishop of Centuria (18 Dec 1925 – death 14 Apr 1944)Apostolic Vicars of Nyeri  
 Bishop-elect Giuseppe Perrachon, I.M.C. (see above 4 Jan 1926 – retired 18 Oct 1930), Titular Bishop of Centuria (18 Dec 1925 – death 14 Apr 1944)
 Carlo Re, I.M.C. (14 Dec 1931 – 1947) (born Italy), Titular Bishop of Hadrumetum (14 Dec 1931  – 29 Dec 1951), also Apostolic Administrator of Meru (Kenya) (1932 – 16 Sep 1936), later Bishop of Ampurias (Italy) (29 Dec 1951  – 10 Feb 1961) and Bishop of Civita–Tempio (Italy) (29 Dec 1951 – retired 10 Feb 1961), emeritate as Titular Bishop of Aspona (10 Feb 1961 – death 12 Aug 1978)
 Carlo Maria Cavallera, I.M.C. (19 Jun 1947  – 25 Mar 1953 see below), Titular Bishop of Sufes (19 Jun 1947  – 25 Mar 1953), also Apostolic Administrator of Meru (Kenya) (1947 – 3 Mar 1954)Suffragan Bishops of Nyeri  
 Carlo Maria Cavallera, I.M.C. (born Italy) (see above 25 Mar 1953  – 25 Nov 1964), later Bishop of Marsabit (Kenya) (25 Nov 1964 – retired 1981), died 1990
 Caesar Gatimu (25 Nov 1964 – death 20 Feb 1987) (first native incumbent), previously Titular Bishop of Abila in Palæstina (18 Apr 1961  – 25 Nov 1964) & Auxiliary Bishop of Nyeri (18 Apr 1961  – 25 Nov 1964)
 Nicodemus Kirima (12 Mar 1988  – 21 May 1990 see below), previously Bishop of Mombasa (Kenya) (27 Feb 1978  – 12 Mar 1988); also President of Kenya Conference of Catholic Bishops (1988 – 1991 and 1989 – 1997)Metropolitan Archbishops of Nyeri Nicodemus Kirima (see above 21 May 1990 - death 27 Nov 2007)Apostolic Administrator (2007.12 – 19 Apr 2008) John Njue, while Metropolitan Archbishop of Nairobi (Kenya) (6 Oct 2007 – ...) and Cardinal-Priest of Preziosissimo Sangue di Nostro Signore Gesù Cristo (24 Nov 2007 [17 Feb 2008] – ...); previously Bishop of Embu (Kenya) (9 Jun 1986  – 9 Mar 2002), President of Kenya Conference of Catholic Bishops (1997 – 2003), Coadjutor Archbishop of Nyeri (9 Mar 2002  – 6 Oct 2007), Apostolic Administrator of Diocese of Isiolo (Kenya) (2005 – 25 Jan 2006), President of Kenya Conference of Catholic Bishops (2006 – 2015), Apostolic Administrator of Diocese of Murang’a (Kenya) (2006.11 – 4 Apr 2009)
 Peter J. Kairo (19 April 2008 - retired 23 April 2017), previously Bishop of Murang’a (Kenya) (17 Mar 1983  – 21 Apr 1997), Bishop of Nakuru (Kenya) (21 Apr 1997  – 19 Apr 2008)
 Anthony Muheria (23 Apr 2017 – ...): previously Bishop of Embu (Kenya) (30 Oct 2003  – 28 Jun 2008), Bishop of Kitui (Kenya) (28 Jun 2008  – 23 Apr 2017), Apostolic Administrator of Diocese of Machakos (Kenya) (2015.02 – 23 Apr 2017).

Coadjutor Archbishop
John Njue (2002-2007), did not succeed to see; appointed Archbishop of Nairobi (Cardinal in 2007)

Auxiliary Bishop
Caesar Gatimu (1961-1964), appointed Bishop here

Other priests of this diocese who became bishops
James Maria Wainaina Kungu (priest here, 1984-2002), appointed Bishop of Muranga in 2009
Joseph Ndembu Mbatia (priest here, 1989-2003), appointed Bishop of Nyahururu in 2011

Parishes by Deanery 
The Archdiocese of Nyeri consists of eight Deaneries, which comprise the following parishes :

 Nyeri Municipality Deanery
Cathedral Parish
St. Jude Parish
King’ong’o Parish
Mwenji Parish
Kiamuiru Parish
Mathari Institutions Chaplaincy
St. Charles Lwanga Parish
 Mukurwe-ini Deanery
Mukurwe-ini Parish
Kaheti Parish
Kimondo Parish
Gikondi Parish
 Othaya Deanery
Othaya Parish
Kariko Parish
Birithia Parish
Karima Parish
Kagicha Parish
Karuthi Parish
Kigumo Parish
 Nanyuki Deanery
Nanyuki Parish
Dol Dol Parish
Matanya Parish
St. Teresa Parish
Kalalu Parish
 Narumoru Deanery
Narumoru Town Parish
Irigithathi Parish
Thegu Parish
Kiganjo Parish
Munyu Parish
 Karatina Deanery
Karatina Parish
Miiri Parish
Giakaibei Parish
Gikumbo Parish
Gathugu Parish
Ngandu Parish
Kabiru-ini Parish
Kahira-ini Parish
 Tetu Deanery
Tetu Parish
Wamagana Parish
Kigogo-ini Parish
Itheguri Parish
Gititu Parish
Kagaita Parish
Giakanja Parish
Karangia Parish (Karangia LC, Mathakwaini LC, Kiambugu LC, Ihithe LC, Hubuini LC)*Local Church
 Gatarakwa Deanery
Mweiga Parish
Endarasha Parish
Gatarakwa Parish
Karemeno Parish
Mugunda Parish
Sirima Parish
Winyumiririe Parish
Kamariki Parish

Contacts 
Nyeri Catholic Secretariat, P.O. Box 288 - 10100, Nyeri. Tel: +254 721 785 169

See also 

 Archdiocese of Nyeri 

 List of Catholic dioceses in Kenya
Kenya Conference of Catholic Bishops

Sources and external links 

 GCatholic.org - data for all sections
 archdiocese 
 Vicariate Apostolic of Kenia, in Catholic Encyclopedia, New York, Encyclopedia Press, 1913

Roman Catholic dioceses in Kenya
Religion in Kenya
Religious organizations established in 1905
Roman Catholic dioceses and prelatures established in the 20th century
1905 establishments in the British Empire
A